Solo is an album by jazz pianist Oscar Peterson, recorded in concert in 1972 and released in 2002.

Track listing
 "Yesterdays" (Otto Harbach, Jerome Kern) – 3:44
 "Makin' Whoopee" (Walter Donaldson, Gus Kahn) – 3:57
 "Who Can I Turn To (When Nobody Needs Me)" (Leslie Bricusse, Anthony Newley) – 4:45
 "Take the "A" Train" (Billy Strayhorn) – 3:11
 "Body and Soul" (Edward Heyman, Robert Sour, Frank Eyton, Johnny Green) – 4:38
 "Blues of the Prairies" (Oscar Peterson) – 5:03
 "Corcovado" (Antonio Carlos Jobim) – 4:26
 "Blues Etude" (Peterson) – 5:11
 "Autumn Leaves" (Joseph Kosma, Johnny Mercer, Jacques Prévert) – 4:24
 "Here's That Rainy Day" (Johnny Burke, Jimmy Van Heusen) – 5:59
 "Sweet Georgia Brown" (Ben Bernie, Maceo Pinkard, Kenneth Casey) – 4:32
 "Satin Doll" (Duke Ellington, Mercer, Strayhorn) – 5:41
 "Mirage" (Peterson) – 6:16
 "Hogtown Blues" (Peterson) – 5:44

Personnel
 Oscar Peterson – piano

References

Albums produced by Norman Granz
2002 live albums
Oscar Peterson live albums
Pablo Records live albums
Solo piano jazz albums